Limbarda is a genus of succulent, xerophytic  plants in the daisy family.

 Species
 Limbarda crithmoides (L.) Dumort. - (golden samphire) - Mediterranean Region and British Isles
 Limbarda salsoloides  (Turcz.) Ikonn. - Mongolia

 formerly included
Limbarda japonica (Thunb.) Raf. - Inula japonica Thunb.

References

Inuleae
Asteraceae genera
Taxa named by Michel Adanson